Federalist No. 83 is an essay by Alexander Hamilton, the eighty-third of The Federalist Papers. It was published on July 5, 9, and 12, 1788, under the pseudonym Publius, the name under which all The Federalist papers were published. Titled "The Judiciary Continued in Relation to Trial by Jury", it is the last in a series of six essays discussing the powers and limitations of the judicial branch.

External links 

 Text of The Federalist No. 83: congress.gov

83
1788 in American law
1788 essays
1788 in the United States